Abdulaziz bin Turki Abdulaziz Al Saud (born 6 December 1986) is a Saudi prince, businessman, entrepreneur and investor. He was born in Los Angeles, raised in Riyadh and educated in Saudi Arabia, United States and the United Kingdom. He is a grandson of late King Abdullah of Saudi Arabia and a nephew of the international business leader Al-Waleed bin Talal.

Early life and education
Abdulaziz bin Turki bin Talal is the only son of Prince Turki bin Talal. His mother is Sara bint Abdullah, a daughter of former ruler, King Abdullah. His parents divorced, and then, his mother married to Fahd bin Badr.

Abdulaziz holds a bachelor's degree in industrial finance from King Fahd University of Petroleum and Minerals and an MBA in oil and gas management from Coventry University, United Kingdom.

Career
Abdulaziz bin Turki bin Talal started his career at Citigroup in Los Angeles followed by working for a construction company in China, which he later purchased and brought to Saudi Arabia.

Abdulaziz bin Turki bin Talal is the chairman of Eleventh Holding Company, a diversified Saudi-based conglomerate, and vice president of Smantah Group headquartered in Riyadh, Kingdom of Saudi Arabia.

Abdulaziz bin Turki bin Talal spends a considerable portion of his time engaging university-enrolled students with discussions and seminars on entrepreneurship and international business in the Kingdom of Saudi Arabia, the United Kingdom, and the United States].

In 2015 Prince Abdulaziz delivered a talk on "Growth in the Gulf and Entrepreneurship" at the London School of Economics.

He has been investing in Technology and Financial start-ups, in line with the Saudi Vision 2030, as supported by his uncle Prince Mohammed bin Salman.

Philanthropy
On 15 May 2015, with support from one of his former academic supervisors, Abdulaziz bin Turki offered financial assistance to establish an annual scholarship programme towards five Masters/MBA full-time postgraduates students in Coventry University London Campus (CULC). The official launch of the scholarship programme took place in a formal reception in the House of Commons.

References

External links
"Eleventh Holding Company" , Eleventh Holding, 2014
"Smantah Group" , Smantah, 2007

Abdulaziz
1986 births
Abdulaziz
Abdulaziz
Living people
Abdulaziz